Karahashi (written: 唐橋) is a Japanese surname. Notable people with the surname include:

, Japanese actor
, Japanese announcer and professor

Japanese-language surnames